Lars Koslowski (born 22 May 1971) is a former professional tennis player from Germany.

Career
Koslowski, who was coached by Karl Meiler, reached the third round of Men's Singles in the 1992 Australian Open. He defeated former world number five Jimmy Arias in three sets in the opening round, which he followed up with a win in four sets over Italian Paolo Canè. The right handed player was then eliminated in straight sets by the 15th seed David Wheaton 4–6, 3–6, 3–6.

He was runner-up in the Men's Doubles at the 1992 Croatia Open, which partner Sander Groen, which was his best performance in an ATP Tour event.

ATP career finals

Doubles: 1 (0–1)

Challenger titles

Singles: (3)

Doubles: (5)

References

1971 births
Living people
German male tennis players
West German male tennis players
Sportspeople from Kassel
Tennis people from Hesse